Kirstine Roepstorff (born 1972) is a Danish visual artist who lives and works in Fredericia (DK). Roepstorff studied at the Royal Danish Academy of Fine Arts in Copenhagen from 1994-2001 and Rutgers University, Mason School of Fine Art (MFA), USA (2000). In 2016 she was appointed to represent Denmark in the Danish Pavilion at the 57th International Art Exhibition—La Biennale di Venezia 2017, entitled “VIVA ARTE VIVA” and in 2018 her work are presented at Kunsthal Charlottenborg in the extensive solo exhibition Renaissance of the Night

Life and work 
Central to Roepstorff's practice is an acute awareness of balance in its diversity of meanings - from disturbances in power structures of today's world to the human condition with principles of equilibrium in the mind-body. Driven by all which yearn to take form, Roepstorff uses aesthetics, with all it encompasses of incorporeal sensibility and bodily determination, as an entrance to subtler, more intangible aspects of everything that moves us - physically as well as mentally. 

Widely recognized for her early large-scale collages her juxtapositions of fragments hijack our visual culture into new imaginations. Marked by assemblages and layering, the collages encompass materials as fabrics, brass, wood and paper in order to direct attention to spaces in between, of cracks and potential possibilities. Following a more abstract vein, Roepstorff's mobiles, and the use of brass in general, hint a mythical dimension, hovering about cosmic vibrations. Algebraic in their language and with pure forms reminiscent of beings as water, suns and the two-legged, the mobiles suggest a wholeness. Assembled as pendulums the structures themselves are reliant on principles of balance. As a very recent string in a versatile practice, Roepstorff's "waterings" also indicates a layered process, a long repeated application of water and pigment often lasting for months. In this veil of dimness and translucent sedimentations lies an opening towards widespread interpretations, like large canvases of dreams.

A current but profound preoccupation with darkness in all its shapes and spirits materialized itself most intensely at the 57thVenice Biennale where Roepstorff was appointed Danish national representative and made an extensive intervention in the Danish Pavilion. However, darkness as a transitory and regenerating force continues to determine an artistic direction generally concerned with exploring gaps, breaks and in-betweens. The task and challenge of today lie in a fundamental re-accentuation of the dark potentials, for darkness is beginnings: of art, of lives and of visions.

Roepstorff's practice unfolds an ongoing endeavor to shed light on our shadows, to shape the shapeless and encapsulate time in its passing, coming and being. Essentially, our being stretches far into spaces of the immaterial, and art interweaves all these corners of our existence: from the fluid metaphysical realms of beyond to our bright and dim and tangible reality.

Collages 
Roepstorff’s basis is collages incorporating media images that visualize existing power relations and critically deal with the history and failures of political ideas. By editing and decomposing the original material her works generate new contexts that open up spaces for negotiation and new narratives. The collages are often large using different materials like fabrics, photocopies, cuttings, foils, brass, wood and paper. 

“Her approach to collage can be seen as an experimental philosophical strategy. At the heart of it is the cutting-out of images, with the resulting positive and negative spaces carrying traces of the other. It’s from here that the artist has come up with her own slogan: ‘Everything matters, even if it doesn’t seem to.’ Pushing collage into wall-covering tableaux and expansive series with growing formal and narrative complexity, the artist builds drama on the wide scope of existing visual media representations. She incorporates images from the news as easily as historic material and advertising imagery, ‘appropri-arranging’ them in the process of photocopying, scaling, cropping, composing and editing the final work.” (Detta von Jouanne, Flash Art Online, 2010)

Recent works 
In the past 5-6 years Roepstorff has broadened her collage practice by incorporating sculptural elements into her work creating new visual and bodily engaging experiences. Her sculptures have mainly been made of concrete and brass. 

"The themes in my art are almost unchanged, but my approach has changed. My very young collages were also young people themselves. There was so much material and density of images, input and information that the viewer came to the same place as me. The spaces were few, but they were there and they were and are important. For space is space of potential, a state of uncertainty, balance and dis-balance, light and dark, the part of the structure that the interpretation may ooze from.” (Interview with Kirstine Roepstorff by Sara Thetmark, Kopenhagen Magasin, 2016)

Balance is a key word for Roepstorff. Her works are often composed around horizontal lines whose divisions reflect different layers of consciousness. This is especially seen in her brass mobiles which Roepstorff denotes ‘Klangmennesker’ (Sound people) – “We're some kind of vibrational beings that are walking around, sometimes in unison, sometimes not. Whether we are able to go in harmony with our surroundings is very much about how our own inner sound is tuned.” (Interview with Kirstine Roepstorff by Sara Thetmark, Kopenhagen Magasin, 2016)

Selected works 
In recent years Roepstorff has created several large scale public art projects in Denmark, including "The Gong" for Dokk1 in Aarhus (2015) and "Klangfrø" for the Department of Nordic Studies and Linguistics at the University of Copenhagen (2014). In the spring of 2017 she completed a major decoration at the Sygehus Lillebælt Hospital in Kolding and when the new town hall in Middelfart was inaugurated in September 2017 it featured a large scale brass mobile by Roepstorff titled "Heart of the Whale".

57th International Art Exhibition—La Biennale di Venezia 2017 
Roepstorff is appointed to represent Denmark at the Venice Biennale 2017. The decision of appointing her was made by Gitte Ørskou (chair), Lilibeth Cuenca Rasmussen, Bodil Nielsen and Jacob Tækker, The Danish Arts Foundation Committee of Visual Arts Project Funding. The Committee acts as commissioner and funds the Danish Pavilion at the Venice Biennale.

For the Danish Pavilion in Venice, Roepstorff has developed the exhibition project INFLUENZA: Theatre of Glowing Darkness. Because we need to relearn. The exhibition will explore the metamorphosis that occurs between the destruction of the known and the embrace of the new.     

”Kirstine Roepstorff stands as an artist for something special and unique, also in an international context”, says The Danish Arts Foundation Committee for Visual Arts Project Funding who acts as commissioner for the Danish Pavilion and has appointed Kirstine Roepstorff to represent Denmark at the Venice Biennale in 2017. 

”Kirstine Roepstorff has an extensive and powerful backlist, major solo exhibitions, several large scale public art projects and international experience. Her artistic practice has had a huge impact on the Danish art scene in recent times and her works have the high quality and the stature required in Venice”, says Gitte Ørskou, chair of The Danish Arts Foundation Committee for Visual Arts Project Funding. 

For the so far largest survey and presentation of her work in Denmark, Kirstine Roepstorff has created the massive intervention "Renaissance of the Night", covering the entire south wing of Kunsthal Charlottenborg during the summer of 2018. The exhibition is both a continuation of Roepstorff's Venice project yet a widening and a renewal of the perspectives on darkness and its revitalizing potentials.

Other projects 
 2003: Outdoor Poster project, Brandenburg, DE
 2003: Picture feature in the ‘op ed’ of ‘Politiken’ Danish newspaper, DK
 2003: A4 gallery, initiated by the national broadcasting and television of Denmark, DK
 2005: Project for Deutsche Bank for Frieze Art Fair, London, UK
 2006: Home for Lost Ideas, book project by Catherine Griffiths and Daniele Rees
 2009: Scorpios garden (curator), Temporäre Kunsthalle, Berlin, DE (with catalogue)
 2016: Design for series of dresses for Stine Goya

Texts 
 Kunitz, Daniel, The Power of Weakness: Kirstine Roepstorff’s Collage: It’s not the Eye of the Needle that Changed ‐ The Frame, Drawing Center, New York, 2007, exhibition catalogue.
 Smith, Roberta, Just Enough Seriousness to Go Around, The New York Times, June 20, 2008.
 Politit, Giancarlo, Focus: Painting, Dead Language or Cultural Terrorism?, Flash Art, December 2008.
 Von Jouanne, Detta, It’s not the Eye of the Needle, Flash Art, October 5, 2010.
 Ladewig, Rebekka, Do we wonder with the head and not with the heart...? Thoughts on Kirstine Roepstorff´s Wunderkammer, in: Dietrich, Nikola, Kirstine Roepstorff, Dried Dew Drops. Wunderkammer of Formlessness, Hatje Cantz, 2010, S. 25 pp.

Catalogues and publications 
 Who Decides Who Decides, Berlin, DE, 2004.
 Fleur du Mal (DADDY magazine no. 3), Peres Projects, DE, 2007.
 It's Not the Eye of the Needle that Changed, Exhibition catalogue, Drawing Center, New York, US, 2007.* The Inner Sound that Kills The Outer, published by JRP Ringier, MUSAC, Leon, ES, 2008.
 Nuit: Sun forms of beneath, Exhibition catalogue, Kunsthallen Brandts, Odense, DK, 2009.
 Dried Dew Drops. Wunderkammer Of Formlessness. 2010.
 Museum für Gegenwartskunst Basel, The National Museum of Art, Architecture and Design, Oslo, pub. Hatje Cantz, NO, 2010.
 Illuminating Shadows, Galerie im Taxispalais, Innsbruck, Stadtgalerie Schwaz, Düsseldorf, DE, 2010.
 Horizons of the Moving Mind, Kunstverein Göttingen, pub. Argobooks, 2014.
 Walking Beside Time, Kunstpalais Erlangen, pub. Kerber Verlag, DE, 2014.
 CMMN CLD, Published with König Books, DK, 2017

External links
 http://www.gallerikirk.dk/cv-english_203.html
 http://www.andersenscontemporary.dk/
 https://www.artsy.net/artist/kirstine-roepstorff
 http://www.kunstonline.dk/profil/kirstine_roepstorff.php
 http://www.saatchigallery.com/artists/kirstine_roepstorff.htm
 http://www.kunstonline.dk/profil/kirstine_roepstorff.php
 http://kopenhagen.dk/magasin/magazine-single/article/paa-sansernes-mark-besoeg-hos-kirstine-roepstorff/
 http://www.flashartonline.com/article/kirstine-roepstorff/

Royal Danish Academy of Fine Arts alumni
Rutgers University alumni
Artists from Copenhagen
Recipients of the Eckersberg Medal
1972 births
Living people
Danish contemporary artists